Mundo Hispánico (Spanish: Hispanic World) was a monthly cultural and political magazine which existed between 1948 and 1977. The subtitle of the magazine was La revista de veintitrés países (Spanish: The Twenty-Three Country Magazine) which indicated the fact that it did not only target readers in Spain, but also those in Latin America. It was one of the publications of the Francoist rule which supported the regime.

History and profile
Mundo Hispánico was launched in Madrid in February 1948. Alfredo Sánchez Bella was the founder of the magazine which was published by the Institute of Hispanic Culture (IHC). It was the second publication launched by the IHC. Its format was large, and the magazine contained full-colour photographs. Mundo Hispánico folded in December 1977 after the publication of its 357th issue.

Contributors and content
Major contributors included Tono, Miguel Mihura, López Rubio, Estebita, Máximo, Cebrián, Mena, Munoa, Picazo, Chumy Chúmez, Cesc, Luis Medrano and Zeus. Enrique Herreros worked for the magazine being responsible for the selection of the drawings. 

Frequent topics featured in the magazine included Spain’s colonial past, classical and contemporary Spanish art and architecture, technical innovations, Spanish cinema and fashion and bullfighting. It published special issues for the leading figures of the Spanish cultural tradition such as the painter Francisco Goya. In addition, Mundo Hispánico responded the negative reports and comments about Spain by the US magazines such as Life.

References

External links

1948 establishments in Spain
1977 disestablishments in Spain
Defunct political magazines published in Spain
Fascist newspapers and magazines
Former state media
Francoist Spain
Magazines established in 1948
Magazines disestablished in 1977
Magazines published in Madrid
Spanish-language magazines